Ma Jung-kil (born March 13, 1979, in Cheongju, Chungcheongbuk-do) is a South Korean sidearm relief pitcher who plays for the Nexen Heroes of the KBO League. He bats and throws right-handed.

Amateur career 
Ma attended Cheongju Technical High School. In , he was selected for the South Korean junior national team and competed in the World Junior Baseball Championship held in Moncton, Canada.

However, Ma decided to enter the Eagles after graduation from college and continued to play baseball at Dankook University in Cheonan, Chungcheongnam-do. During his collegiate years at Dankook University, Ma was considered one of the top sidearm/submarine pitchers along with Chong Tae-Hyon of Kyung Hee University. As a sophomore, he was first called up to the South Korea national baseball team for the 3-Nations Invitational Baseball Tournament held in Taiwan.

In , Ma helped his team to win the President's Flag Collegiate Baseball Championship. After the championship, he was selected for the South Korean collegiate national team and competed in the friendly baseball series again the United States national baseball team.

Notable international careers

Professional career 
Upon graduation from Dankook University in 2002, Ma entered the Hanwha Eagles. He had a mediocre rookie season, going 2-5 with 6 saves and 6 holds in 59 games and posted a 5.40 ERA in 60.0 innings pitched as a relief pitcher. In 2003, Ma lowered his ERA to 4.06 and amassed 2 saves and 9 holds appearing in 63 games as a setup man. In 2004, however, he appeared in just 33 games due to injuries. After the 2004 season, Ma left the Unicorns to serve the two-year military service.

Ma joined the Hanwha Eagles again in 2007 when he was discharged from the military duty.

Ma was sidelined with a left knee ligament rupture in the second half of the 2011 season and missed the entire 2012 season.

Notable international careers

External links 
 KBO League career statistics from Koreabaseball.com

South Korean baseball players
Hanwha Eagles players
Kiwoom Heroes players
1979 births
Living people
Jangheung Ma clan
People from Cheongju
Sportspeople from North Chungcheong Province